Neve Yamin (lit. abode of the right (hand of God)) is a moshav in central Israel. Located near Kfar Saba and covering 3,300 dunams, it falls under the jurisdiction of Drom HaSharon Regional Council.

History
The moshav was formed in 1950 by Jewish immigrants from Greece, Iraq, Libya, Persia and North Africa on the land of  the  Palestinian  village of Kafr Saba, which was  depopulated   in May 1948. 

Its name is derived from the bible: "The right hand of God is lifted high." (Psalm 188:15).

References

1950 establishments in Israel
Greek-Jewish culture in Israel
Iranian-Jewish culture in Israel
Iraqi-Jewish culture in Israel
Libyan-Jewish culture in Israel
Moshavim
North African-Jewish culture in Israel
Populated places established in 1950
Populated places in Central District (Israel)